María Luisa Flores (born October 12, 1979, Caracas, Distrito Capital, Venezuela), is a Venezuelan actress and model.

Filmography

References

External links 

1979 births
Living people
Actresses from Caracas
Venezuelan telenovela actresses
Venezuelan female models